Thuesen is a surname. Notable people with the surname include:

Marius Thuesen (1878–1941), Danish gymnast
Peter J. Thuesen (born 1971), American religious scholar
Peter Thuesen (sport shooter) (born 1978), Danish sport shooter
Karen Thuesen Massaro (born 1944), Danish ceramist

See also 
Thuesen-Petersen House, is a historic pair-house in Scipio, Utah